Ashraf Luthfy (born 16 June 1973) is a Maldivian footballer who is well known by his nickname "Sampath". He plays at Club Valencia as a midfielder.

International career
Ashraf Luthfee got his chance in the Maldives national football team in 1993 but, he made his debut in 1995. He has appeared in FIFA World Cup qualifying matches for the Maldives.

References

External links 

Luthfy Ashraf at 11v11.com

1973 births
Living people
Maldivian footballers
Maldives international footballers
Victory Sports Club players
New Radiant S.C. players
Club Valencia players
Association football midfielders
Footballers at the 2002 Asian Games
Asian Games competitors for the Maldives
Club Eagles players